The Gotha Go 147 was a German experimental two-seat tailless aircraft designed in 1936 by Gothaer Waggonfabrik and Dr. A. Kupper. Two examples were built and flown. Development was abandoned before the start of World War II.

Design and development
The original aim was to create a two-seat fighter with an exceptional field of fire for the tail gunner. The design featured a high-mounted gull wing, gently tapered and swept back to give a leading-edge sweep of 38 degrees. The gull centre section had a straight leading edge, while endplate fins and rudders were mounted on the tips. The crew sat in tandem behind the single engine.

An experimental prototype was first constructed, designated the Go 147a.

Flight tests demonstrated instability, but showed enough promise for a production prototype, the Go 147b, to be built. Several roles were now under consideration, including gunnery training, a twin-engined fighter with a second, pusher engine in the rear, and an observation aircraft. Featuring an N-strut braced wing with full-span trailing-edge slotted flaperons, the design also had a fixed undercarriage. Construction was conventional, with welded steel-tube fuselage and wooden two-spar wing. Power came from a more powerful  Argus engine. Although planned, no armament was fitted.

Operational history
The Go 147a first flew in 1936. During trials, a number of stability problems were encountered.

The redesigned Go 147b was registered as D-IQVI. Extensive trials failed to cure its poor flight characteristics and the project was terminated in 1938 or 1939.

See also
 Westland-Hill Pterodactyl V: Near-contemporary of similar role and configuration.
 Gotha Go 229: Later Gotha tailless flying wing, derived from the Horten Ho 229.

Specification (Go 147b)

References

Go 147
Tailless aircraft